The 1929 Kentucky Wildcats football team represented the University of Kentucky as a member of the Southern Conference (SoCon) during the 1929 college football season. Led by third-year head coach Harry Gamage, the Wildcats compiled an overall record of 6–1–1 with a mark of 3–1–1 in conference play, placing sixth in the SoCon.

Schedule

References

Kentucky
Kentucky Wildcats football seasons
Kentucky Wildcats football